Faizabad Junction railway station (officially known as Ayodhya Cantt Junction railway station) is a junction railway station in Uttar Pradesh, India. It is located on the Lucknow-Varanasi section and is a part of the Northern Railway zone.

History 
The station was established in 1874. In October 2021, the chief minister of Uttar Pradesh, Yogi Adityanath, decided to rename the station "Ayodhya Cantt railway station". On 2 November 2021 Indian Railways consented to the change of name, which also changed the station code from FD to AYC.

Trains
The trains originating from this station are: 
 Faizabad Delhi Express
 Saket Express
 Rameswaram–Faizabad Shraddha Sethu Express
 Faizabad Superfast Express

Gallery

See also
 Lucknow Charbagh railway station
 Akbarpur railway station
 
 Rudauli railway station

References

External links

Railway junction stations in Uttar Pradesh
Railway stations in Faizabad district
Lucknow NR railway division
Railway stations opened in 1874
Transport in Faizabad
Buildings and structures in Faizabad